

189001–189100 

|-id=004
| 189004 Capys || 3184 T-3 || Capys, king of Dardania, from Classical mythology. He was the son of Assaracus and the father of Anchises. || 
|-id=011
| 189011 Ogmios ||  || Ogmios, Celtic patron god of scholars and the personification of eloquence and persuasiveness || 
|-id=018
| 189018 Guokeda ||  || The University of the Chinese Academy of Sciences (UCAS), also known as "Guokeda", is the first and largest graduate education institution in the P.R. China, having granted the country's first Ph.D.s in science and in engineering. UCAS started enrolling undergraduate students in 2014. || 
|-id=035
| 189035 Michaelsummers ||  || Michael E. Summers (born 1954) is a professor of planetary sciences and astronomy at George Mason University. He worked as a co-investigator and as a Deputy Atmospheres Team Lead for the New Horizons mission to Pluto. || 
|}

189101–189200 

|-id=188
| 189188 Floraliën ||  || The Gentse Floraliën (Floralies of Ghent) is a world-famous flower exhibition held in Ghent (Belgium) every five years || 
|}

189201–189300 

|-id=202
| 189202 Calar Alto ||  || Calar Alto Observatory, in the Sierra de los Filabres in Andalusia, southern Spain || 
|-id=261
| 189261 Hiroo ||  || Hiroo Itagaki (1949–1977), brother of the Japanese amateur astronomer Koichi Itagaki who discovered this minor planet || 
|-id=264
| 189264 Gerardjeong ||  || Gerard K. Jeong (born 1973), humanitarian, healer, and spine surgeon at Tucson Orthopedic Institute || 
|}

189301–189400 

|-id=310
| 189310 Polydamas ||  || Polydamas from Greek mythology. He was a Trojan commander during the Trojan War whose battle strategy was more cautious than that of his friend Hektor. || 
|-id=312
| 189312 Jameyszalay ||  || Jamey R. Szalay (born 1988), an Associate Research Scholar at Princeton University who worked as a PhD student with the Student Dust Counter Instrument for the New Horizons mission to Pluto. || 
|-id=347
| 189347 Qian ||  || Qian Zhongshu (1910–1998), Chinese literary scholar and writer || 
|-id=396
| 189396 Sielewicz ||  || Henryk Sielewicz (born 1949), a Lithuanian amateur astronomer || 
|-id=398
| 189398 Soemmerring ||  || Samuel Thomas von Sömmerring (1755–1830), German anthropologist, anatomist, paleontologist and inventor || 
|}

189401–189500 

|-bgcolor=#f2f2f2
| colspan=4 align=center | 
|}

189501–189600 

|-bgcolor=#f2f2f2
| colspan=4 align=center | 
|}

189601–189700 

|-bgcolor=#f2f2f2
| colspan=4 align=center | 
|}

189701–189800 

|-id=795
| 189795 McGehee ||  || Peregrine McGehee (born 1960), an American astronomer and a contributor to the Sloan Digital Sky Survey. || 
|}

189801–189900 

|-id=848
| 189848 Eivissa ||  || Eivissa (Ibiza in Spanish) is the westernmost of the Balearic islands || 
|}

189901–190000 

|-id=930
| 189930 Jeanneherbert ||  || Jeanne Herbert (born 1958), a grants management specialist for the Bisbee (Arizona) Unified School District || 
|-id=944
| 189944 Leblanc || 2003 TX || Thierry Leblanc (born 1967), the group supervisor of the Atmospheric Lidar Group, and Principal Investigator of stratospheric and tropospheric ozone, and temperature lidar measurements at the Table Mountain Observatory. || 
|-id=945
| 189945 Teddykareta ||  || Theodore Kareta (born 1995) an American planetary scientist who studies small Solar System bodies, in particular active asteroids, comets, and centaurs with ground-based telescopes in the visible and near-infrared spectrum at Lowell Observatory (Src, Src). || 
|-id=948
| 189948 Richswanson ||  || Rich Swanson (born 1964) is an intelligence specialist for a contractor to the Department of Defense at Ft. Huachuca, Arizona || 
|}

References 

189001-190000